Boronia rozefeldsii, commonly known as Schouten Island boronia, is a species of plant in the citrus family Rutaceae and is endemic to a small Tasmanian island. It is an erect, woody shrub with pinnate leaves and pink, four-petalled flowers. It is similar to B. pilosa which grows on the same island, but has larger petals and fewer hairs on the leaflets.

Description
The eight stamens are hairy with pimply glands near the tip and the stigma is tiny. Flowering has been observed in November.

Taxonomy and naming
Boronia rozefeldsii was first formally described in 2003 by Marco F. Duretto and the description was published in the journal Muelleria. The specific epithet (rozefeldsii) honours Andrew Rozefelds who first recognised this as a new species.

Distribution and habitat
This boronia grows in shallow crevices on bare granite outcrops on Schouten Island in Freycinet National Park.

References 

rozefeldsii
Flora of Tasmania
Plants described in 2003
Taxa named by Marco Duretto